Junie Alexander Mitchum, born 22 November 1973 in Saint Kitts, is a West Indian cricketer who has played first-class and List A cricket for the Leeward Islands.

References

1973 births
Living people
Kittitian cricketers
Leeward Islands cricketers
Saint Kitts representative cricketers
Rest of Leeward Islands cricketers
West Indian cricketers of the 21st century